Watkins Point Farm, also known as the James L. Horsey Farm and John T. Adams Farm, is a historic home located at Marion Station, Somerset County, Maryland. It is a three-part frame and sawn log dwelling. The one-room plan sawn log house was erected around 1780-90 and is extended to the west by a single-story, mid-19th century hyphen that connects the two-story, transverse-hall plan main block, erected around 1850.  The interiors retain large portions of original woodwork.  Also on the property is a 20th-century rusticated-block potato house.

It was listed on the National Register of Historic Places in 2002.

References

External links
, including photo from 2002, at Maryland Historical Trust

Houses in Somerset County, Maryland
Houses on the National Register of Historic Places in Maryland
Federal architecture in Maryland
Greek Revival houses in Maryland
Houses completed in 1780
National Register of Historic Places in Somerset County, Maryland